In Greek mythology, Proteus (Ancient Greek: Πρωτεύς - protos, "first")  was an ancient Egyptian king who was associated with the island of Pharos, his residence in Homer's Odyssey. Virgil, however, instead of Pharos, mentions the island of Carpathos, between Crete and Rhodes. This Greek island is the closest to Pharos geographically.

Etymology
'Proteus' may be based on one of the titles of the Egyptian king, pꜣ-rwtj, signifying the "high doors" (cf. Sublime Porte) of the temple.

Proteus also seems to have been associated with Thrace, and legends portray him as coming from Thrace to Egypt, or as going from Egypt to Thrace.

There's also some sort of association of Proteus with the island of Lemnos, close to Thrace.

Mythology

Alternate story of Helen
Herodotus invoked Proteus in his telling of the story of Helen of Troy. In Book II of The History, the story is told of how Proteus rose to the throne of Egypt out of Memphis, succeeding Pheron as king. He was later succeeded by Rhampsinitus (Ramesses III, as he was known by the Egyptians).  When Paris stole Helen from Sparta, winds blew him off his intended course and he found himself in Egypt.  Upon their arrival, Paris and his servants discovered a temple, in which the slaves realized it would be profitable for them to take refuge. Thus, they deserted Paris, informing the authorities of his numerous wrongdoings. Word of Paris' crimes reached Proteus, who then requested Paris be brought forth for inquiry. Proteus asked Paris for the details of his journey, ultimately concluding that despite his anger and Paris' terrible actions, he cannot kill a man who is a stranger from another land. Instead of death as Paris' punishment, Proteus took Helen from Paris and seized the treasure stolen from Menelaus, intending to return both Helen and the treasure to Menelaus, to whom they were rightfully due. Proteus then urged Paris to leave Egypt.

Herodotus also makes references to Homer's Iliad and Odyssey, claiming Homer must have been aware of this version of events despite using the more common story.

Tragedy by Euripides
Another take on this story is presented in the tragedy Helen by Euripides.  In Euripides' version, Hera had Helen taken to Egypt by Hermes, and she created a phantom replacement of Helen which Paris takes to Troy.  The play takes place when Menelaus arrives at Egypt after the war. Here Proteus had safeguarded Helen throughout the Trojan War, but is dead before the play begins.  It opens with Helen visiting his tomb.  According to Euripides, Proteus was married to the Nereid Psamathe, had a son Theoclymenos, and a daughter Theonoe who was a gifted seer. Theoclymenos became the new king of Egypt after Proteus and had intentions of marrying Helen.

Proteus in The Odyssey
In the tale which Menelaus recites to Telemachus son of Odysseus, Menelaus mentions being stranded on the island called Pharos. It is here after 20 days that he is approached by the goddess Eidothea daughter of Proteus. In this meeting she asks why Menelaus willingly stays on the island to which he replies" Whichever of the divinities you are let me tell you that I am not here of my own free will, i seem to have angered a god but which one I do not know, tell me now since gods are all knowing to whom I have displeased ". Eidothea explains that it was Proteus who keeps him ashore. She hatched a plan which could vouch Menelaus escape from the island which included the ambush of Proteus the first minister of Poseidon.

Notes

References 

 Euripides, Euripides II: The Cyclops and Heracles, Iphigenia in Tauris, Helen (The Complete Greek Tragedies) (Vol 4), University Of Chicago Press; 1 edition (April 15, 2002). .
 Herodotus, The Histories with an English translation by A. D. Godley. Cambridge. Harvard University Press. 1920. . Online version at the Topos Text Project. Greek text available at Perseus Digital Library.
 Homer, The Iliad with an English Translation by A.T. Murray, Ph.D. in two volumes. Cambridge, MA., Harvard University Press; London, William Heinemann, Ltd. 1924. . Online version at the Perseus Digital Library.
Homer, Homeri Opera in five volumes. Oxford, Oxford University Press. 1920. . Greek text available at the Perseus Digital Library.
 Publius Vergilius Maro, Bucolics, Aeneid, and Georgics of Vergil. J. B. Greenough. Boston. Ginn & Co. 1900. Online version at the Perseus Digital Library.

Kings of Egypt in Herodotus
Kings of Egypt in Greek mythology
Kings in Greek mythology
People of the Trojan War
pt:Proteu (mitologia)
Egyptian characters in Greek mythology